Henry John Cecil Turner was a rugby union international who represented England in 1871 in the first international match.

Early life
H.J.C. Turner was born in Wartling, Sussex in 1850, and was christened on 3 March 1850 in the parish church. He was the younger son of John Turner (1817 to 1858) and Louisa Kemp (born 1824). His father was the Curate of Wartling at the time, a graduate of Balliol College, Oxford University (B.A. 1838, M.A. 1844), he became the Rector of Tiffield in 1853 and died in 1858. Henry had at least two brothers, Edmund Malcolm Turner (born 1847) and Cyril James (born 1852), and two sisters, Ellen (born c.1849) and Alice Mary (1854–1945). His brother was educated at Marlborough College but Henry was educated at St Nicholas College, Lancing (Lancing College) Having entered Lancing in 1861 and left in 1867, he would have been a contemporary at Lancing with Reginald Birkett who later played alongside him in the England rugby squad. His brother, Cyril James, also went to Lancing and eventually became a member of Lloyd's of London.

Rugby union career
By 1871, Turner had moved to Manchester and there he played for the Manchester Football Club. Turner made his international debut on 27 March 1871 at Edinburgh in the Scotland vs England match, the first international rugby match. He was one of four Manchester players to be selected. He was not selected to play for England again, perhaps due to his possible emigration.

Later life and career
In 1871, Turner was living in Manchester, boarding at the Albion Hotel in the Piccadilly district of the city. He was a banker's clerk. His brother, Edmund, had migrated to the United States previous to this, but whether Henry joined him there is not known. His old school, Lancing College, registered him as having died in a publication of their register in 1900, but a date or details were not given.

References

1850 births
England international rugby union players
English rugby union players
People educated at Lancing College
People from Wealden District
Rugby union forwards
Rugby union players from East Sussex
Year of death missing
Manchester Rugby Club players